The Yasar Dogu Tournament 2008, was a wrestling event held in Ankara, Turkey between 9 and 10 February 2008. This tournament was held as 36th.

This international tournament includes competition in both men's and women's freestyle wrestling. This ranking tournament was held in honor of the two time Olympic Champion, Yaşar Doğu.

Medal table

Team ranking

Medal overview

Men's freestyle

Women's freestyle

Participating nations

References 

Yasar Dogu 2008
2008 in sport wrestling
Sports competitions in Ankara
Yaşar Doğu Tournament
International wrestling competitions hosted by Turkey